The 2019 Indian Premier League Final was a Twenty20 cricket match played between Chennai Super Kings and the Mumbai Indians on 12 May 2019 at the Rajiv Gandhi International Cricket Stadium in Hyderabad. It was the culmination of the 2019 season of the Indian Premier League (IPL), an annual Twenty20 tournament held in India. MI won the match by a single run and claimed their fourth Indian Premier League title.

The final was originally intended to be held at the M. A. Chidambaram Stadium in Chennai. In April 2019, however, the Board of Control for Cricket in India (BCCI) confirmed that alternative arrangements had been made, citing a long-standing issue of three closed stands at the original host stadium. Later in the same month, the Rajiv Gandhi International Cricket Stadium was confirmed as the venue for the final.

After winning the toss, MI  elected to bat first. MI scored 149 runs for eight wickets in their 20 overs, Kieron Pollard top-scored with 41 runs. Chennai bowler Deepak Chahar took three wickets in the innings. In response, Chennai was guided by Shane Watson, who was the highest scorer of the match with 80 runs. Some tight bowling at the death, saw Chennai falling one run short with 148. Mumbai Indians' Jasprit Bumrah was awarded the player of the match for his spell of two for 14 in his four overs.

Road to the final

Group stage
Mumbai Indians were ranked first in the league table, though their campaign started with a loss (by 36 runs) to Delhi Capitals. After getting defeated by Kings XI Punjab, they went on to win their next three matches against Super Kings, Sunrisers and Kings XI. Mumbai had a successful second half of the league stage with five wins out of seven matches. In the group stage, they won nine matches out of fourteen and qualified for the playoffs.

Chennai Super Kings started their season campaign with a seven-wicket win over the Royal Challengers Bangalore. Chennai had a successful first half of the season with six wins out of seven matches, which included an opening three consecutive wins. Their run was finally ended by Mumbai. The wins displayed a mixture of both batting and bowling strength, with MS Dhoni taking the main batting role in his team, actively supported by Shane Watson and the bowlers Imran Tahir and Harbhajan Singh. Chennai finished the group stage with nine wins from fourteen matches, and were ranked second in the league table.

Group stage series

Mumbai Indians won the two group stage matches between the finalists, winning the first group stage series match by 37 runs. Suryakumar Yadav scored a half-century and Hardik Pandya scored 25 runs from 8 balls (Mumbai scored 45 runs in the final two overs) to set Chennai a target of 171. Chennai did not start well, and despite Kedar Jadhav scoring 58 runs and forging a 54-run partnership with MS Dhoni, they finished well short. Both Hardik and Lasith Malinga took three wickets, while Jason Behrendorff took two wickets for Mumbai.

Playoffs
The playoff stage of IPL was played according to the Page playoff system and provided Mumbai and Chennai, being the top and second-ranked teams, with two chances for qualifying for the Final. These teams first faced each other in Qualifier 1, with the winners qualifying directly for the final; the loser of Qualifier 1 would then play against the winner of the Eliminator in Qualifier 2, with the winner of that match qualifying for the final.

The Super Kings won the toss in Qualifier 1 and decided to bat first. The team lost Faf du Plessis early,  and Shane Watson and Murali Vijay played cautiously in the beginning, but the Super Kings lost Watson to Krunal Pandya. The Super Kings made runs from their middle-order, with Ambati Rayudu and MS Dhoni scoring 42 and 37 runs respectively, to see the team amass 131 runs for the loss of 4 wickets. Rohit Sharma opened with Quinton de Kock to start the chase for the Mumbai Indians, but both departed early. Though Suryakumar Yadav started slowly, he hit out later against Super Kings bowlers to reach his half-century. After Ishan Kishan's departure, Hardik Pandya joined Yadav to complete the chase for the Mumbai Indians and secure their progression to the final.

Delhi Capitals won against Sunrisers Hyderabad in the Eliminator to set up a match against Chennai to decide the second finalist.

In Qualifier 2, Chennai captain MS Dhoni won the toss and elected to bowl. Delhi lost their both openers early and Rishabh Pant did not receive support from Delhi Capitals players, as wickets kept falling from the other end. Pant scored 38 runs before getting out in the 19th over. In the last over Ishant Sharma helped the Delhi Capitals to finish with 147 runs. Chasing 148 to win, Chennai openers Shane Watson and Faf du Plessis batted slowly and did not score many runs in the first couple of overs. In the final two powerplay overs, du Plesis took charge and changed the momentum of Chennai batting. The two openers put together an 81-run partnership and Chennai successfully chased their 148 run target with the loss of four wickets and qualified for their 8th IPL final.

Match

Summary
Mumbai captain Rohit Sharma won the toss and elected to bat first on which he said, "This is a big game, that's what we prefer to do. We want to bat first, and set down the runs on the board." Chennai captain MS Dhoni said, "We were looking to bowl first. If the result is in your favour, then it’s fine, otherwise, they’ll say the guys are fatigued."

Rohit Sharma led Mumbai Indians became the IPL champion for the fourth time. Mumbai beat Chennai Super Kings by 1 run in a thrilling title match. Mumbai team after the end of IPL 2019 became the most successful team of IPL by winning the fourth title. After Mumbai, Chennai was second in terms of most IPL titles won (3). Chennai won three titles of IPL at that point of time. Mumbai presented 149 runs in the final match played at the Rajiv Gandhi International Cricket Stadium in Hyderabad. In reply, he Chennai team could manage, only 148 runs in the loss of 7 wickets in 20 overs despite the brilliant innings of Shane Watson (80). Watson hit 8 fours and 4 sixes in his 59-ball innings. Apart from this, Faf du Plessis (26), Suresh Raina (8), MS Dhoni (2), Ambati Rayudu scored 1 for Chennai. Rahul Chahar, Lasith Malinga and Krunal Pandya took one wicket each for Mumbai. There were four final matches between these two teams, out of which Mumbai won three while Chennai managed to win once.

Scorecard
 On-field umpires: Ian Gould and Nitin Menon
 Third umpire: Nigel Llong
 Reserve umpire: C. K. Nandan
 Match referee: Javagal Srinath
 Toss: Mumbai Indians won the toss and elected to bat.
 Result: Mumbai Indians won by 1 run and won the 2019 Indian Premier League.

Fall of wickets: 1-45 (de Kock, 4.5 overs), 2-45 (Rohit, 5.2 overs), 3-82 (Suryakumar, 11.2 overs), 4-89 (Krunal, 12.3 overs), 5-101 (Kishan, 14.4 overs), 6-140 (Hardik, 18.2 overs), 7-140 (Rahul, 18.4 overs), 8-141 (McClenaghan, 19.4 overs)

Fall of wickets: 1-33 (du Plessis, 4 overs), 2-70 (Raina, 9.2 overs), 3-73 (Rayudu, 10.3 overs), 4-82 (Dhoni, 12.4 overs), 5-133 (Bravo, 18.2 overs), 6-146 (Watson, 19.4 overs), 7-148 (Thakur, 20 overs),

Key
 * – Captain
  – Wicket-keeper
 c Fielder – the batsman was dismissed by a catch by the named fielder
 b Bowler – the bowler who gains credit for the dismissal
 lbw – the batsman was dismissed leg before wicket
 Total runs are in the format: score/wickets

Post-match
Mumbai received ₹20 Crore rupees and a trophy for being the champions. Rohit said:"Today we played some fine cricket. At the start of the tournament, we wanted to cut the tournament into two halves. Good to see we qualified in the top two in the league Stage and all credit to the whole squad of my team, not just the XI. Even the support staff too."

Chennai's Imran Tahir was given the Purple Cap for getting the highest number of wickets in the league. He took 26 wickets and broke the previous record for most wickets for spin bowler of 24 wickets held jointly by Harbhajan Singh (Mumbai Indians, 2013) and Sunil Narine (Kolkata Knight Riders, 2012).

References

Final
2019 Indian Premier League
May 2019 sports events in India